Heidi L Kloser (born September 18, 1992) is an American freestyle skier noted for mogul skiing. She was once named FIS World Cup women’s moguls Rookie of the Year and she qualified to compete in Women's moguls at the 2014 Winter Olympics. However an injury during a training run forced her to withdraw from competition.

References 

American female freestyle skiers
Freestyle skiers at the 2014 Winter Olympics
1992 births
Olympic freestyle skiers of the United States
Living people
People from Vail, Colorado
Sportspeople from Colorado
21st-century American women